SS Miraflores  was a freighter lost on 19 February 1942. The ship left New Orleans on 6 February 1942 with a crew of 34 and made an intermediate stop in Haiti before sailing for New York on 14 February 1942.
Miraflores was owned by the Standard Fruit and Steamship Company.
She had a gross tonnage of 2,158 and was 270 feet long. She was built in England in 1921 and was engaged in transporting bananas between Central America and New Orleans.

Miraflores was torpedoed and sunk in the Atlantic Ocean north east of Delaware Capes, United States by U-432 with the loss of all 34 crew. The ship was later discovered and identified in 2007.

References

External links 
 
 
 

1942 in Virginia
Maritime incidents in February 1942
Shipwrecks of the Virginia coast
1921 ships
World War II merchant ships of the United Kingdom
Ships built on the River Tyne
Ships sunk by German submarines in World War II
Steamships of the United Kingdom
World War II shipwrecks in the Atlantic Ocean